Josef Šváb-Malostranský (16 March 1860, Prague – 30 October 1932, Prague) was a Czech actor, writer, cabaret singer, publisher, director and screenwriter. He owned a bookstore and song publishing house. He was the first Czech actor performing in three short films directed by Jan Kříženecký in 1898. He was also in the first Czech fully voiced film Když struny lkají in 1931.
His niece was actress Zita Kabátová. He is buried at the Olšany Cemetery in Prague.

Selected filmography
 Gypsies (1922)
 Lásky Kačenky Strnadové (1926)
 The Good Soldier Schweik (1926)
 Chudá holka (1929)
 Kantor Ideál (1932)

External links

Czech male stage actors
Czech male film actors
Czech male silent film actors
20th-century Czech male actors
Czech screenwriters
Male screenwriters
1860 births
1932 deaths
Male actors from Prague
20th-century screenwriters